John Carter Hensley is an American actor, best known for his role as Matt McNamara on Nip/Tuck.

Filmography

External links
 
 World Poker Tour Profile

20th-century American male actors
21st-century American male actors
American male film actors
American male television actors
Male actors from Louisville, Kentucky
Living people
People from Hyden, Kentucky
1977 births